Odumodu is a style of music that originates among the Ohuhu people of the Igbo ethnic group, in south eastern Nigeria and is sung among mature men. The style incorporates many traditional Igbo musical instruments such as the udu and ekwe. Odumodu features vocals from a single male who leads a group of back up vocalists, most of the times these are also instrumentalists. Some famous odumodu artists include King Prof Obewe and King Ogenwanne.

Igbo music
Umuahia